Between 2009 and 2018 (with absence in 2017) the business magazine Forbes had compiled an annual list of the world's most powerful people. The list had one slot for every 100 million people, meaning in 2009 there were 67 people on the list, and by 2018, there were 75. Slots were allocated based on the amount of human and financial resources that they had sway over, as well as their influence on world events.

Gallery of top ten in 2018

Listed seven or more times

Listed every time

Mukesh Ambani
Lloyd Blankfein
Michael Bloomberg
Sergey Brin
Warren Buffett
Jamie Dimon
Larry Fink
Bill Gates
Li Ka-shing
Ali Khamenei
Angela Merkel
Rupert Murdoch
Benjamin Netanyahu
Larry Page
Vladimir Putin
Carlos Slim

Listed eight times

Bernard Arnault (not listed: 2016) 
Jeff Bezos (not listed: 2009) 
Jeff Immelt (not listed: 2018)
Khalifa bin Zayed Al Nahyan (not listed: 2009)
Charles Koch (not listed: 2009)
Robin Li (not listed: 2009)
Barack Obama (not listed: 2018)
Masayoshi Son (not listed: 2009)
Rex Tillerson (not listed: 2018)
Mark Zuckerberg (not listed: 2009)

Listed seven times

Tim Cook (not listed: 2009 & 2010)
Mario Draghi (not listed: 2009 & 2010)
Xi Jinping (not listed: 2009 & 2010)
Christine Lagarde (not listed: 2009 & 2010)
Lakshmi Mittal (not listed: 2016 & 2018)
John Roberts (not listed: 2010 & 2011)
Akio Toyoda (not listed: 2010 & 2011)

See also
Forbes list of The World's 100 Most Powerful Women
40 Under 40
QS World University Rankings
Time 100
Forbes' list of the world's highest-paid athletes
Forbes Global 2000
The World's Billionaires
List of current heads of state and government

References

External links
 The World's Most Powerful People, Forbes.

Powerful People
Lists of 21st-century people
Top people lists